Netaji Nagar College for Women, established in 1986, is an undergraduate women's college in Kolkata, West Bengal, India. It is affiliated with the University of Calcutta.

The college is recognized by the University Grants Commission (UGC).

See also 
Netaji Nagar Day College
Netaji Nagar College
Netaji Nagar, Kolkata
List of colleges affiliated to the University of Calcutta
Education in India
Education in West Bengal

References

External links
 Netaji Nagar College for Women

Educational institutions established in 1986
University of Calcutta affiliates
Universities and colleges in Kolkata
Women's universities and colleges in West Bengal
1986 establishments in West Bengal